The Workers International to Rebuild the Fourth International (WIRFI) is a Trotskyist international organisation. It was formed and based in the United Kingdom and originally consisted of a remnant of the Workers Revolutionary Party.

The organisation was founded in 1990 to regroup the international supporters of the Workers Revolutionary Party (Workers Press) WRP(WP), following the split of some of their supporters to join the International Workers League (Fourth International).  Led by Cliff Slaughter and Dot Gibson, it initially had support in the Workers Revolutionary Party (Namibia) and a South African section which renamed itself WIRFI and took 5,481 votes in the 1994 South African general election, as well as Michel Varga's Group of Opposition and Continuity of the Fourth International.

The majority of the South African section left the international in 1996 and renamed itself the Workers International Vanguard League.

Following the WRP(WP)'s dissolution and reconstitution as the Movement for Socialism (Britain), Gibson and Bob Archer led the remainder of the international in splitting from Slaughter.

The organisation retained its British section and has the support of the WRP of Namibia and remnants of the South African group. It publishes the  "Workers International Journal".

In Britain, the group's supporters were active in the Socialist Alliance and then the Democracy Platform of that grouping. By 2004 they had also become involved with the Liverpool-based Campaign for a Mass Workers Party and its offshoot, the United Socialist Party.

See also
List of Trotskyist internationals

References

External links
 John Sullivan "Will the real WRP please stand up?" in As Soon As This Pub Closes
 official website 
WIRFI archives held as part of the Michel Varga (Balazs Nagy) papers at the University of London

Trotskyist political internationals
Trotskyist organisations in the United Kingdom
Workers Revolutionary Party (UK)
1990 establishments in the United Kingdom
Organizations established in 1990